Golanik, also known as Kalanik, may refer to:
 Golanik-e Olya
 Golanik-e Sofla